Hsieh Su-wei and Peng Shuai were the defending champions, but Hsieh chose not to compete this year and Peng chose to compete in Estoril instead.
6th-seeded Gisela Dulko and Flavia Pennetta won in the final 6–4, 6–2, against 2nd-seeded Nuria Llagostera Vives and María José Martínez Sánchez.

Seeds
The top four seeds received a bye into the second round.

Draw

Finals

Top half

Bottom half

References
 Main Draw

Italian Open - Doubles
Women's Doubles